Vytautas Adolfas Puplauskas (born October 3, 1930 in Telšiai District Municipality) is a Lithuanian politician. In 1990 he was among those who signed the Act of the Re-Establishment of the State of Lithuania.

References
 Biography 

1930 births
Living people
20th-century Lithuanian politicians
People from Telšiai District Municipality
Vytautas Magnus University alumni